Oscar Fox (29 July 1892 – October 1946) was an English footballer who played inside right for Castleford Town and Bradford City. His son, also named Oscar, was also a professional footballer.

Career
Oscar Fox was born in Sheffield. He was playing for Castleford Town when he was spotted by Bradford City in November 1910, making his debut on 18 February 1911 against Oldham Athletic. He made two more appearances in the 1910–11, which remains the club's most successful season. He made just 11 appearances the following season, scoring three goals.

For the following three seasons he was the club's top league goal-scorer as he formed a successful partnership with Dicky Bond. The club could not repeat its success of Fox's first season, but his goals helped to keep City in Division One. He played two more full seasons after the war, before making one final appearance in 1921–22. It proved to be the club's last in the top flight for 77 years. His career finished with a benefit match against Middlesbrough when he made £540.

He returned to his Sheffield home, where he worked in a billiards hall. He died in Nether Edge Hospital, Sheffield, Yorkshire, England in October 1946, aged 54, the same year his son, also called Oscar, had started his own career for Sheffield Wednesday. He played for Wednesday and Mansfield Town more than 300 times as a wing-half.

References

1892 births
1946 deaths
Footballers from Sheffield
English footballers
Association football inside forwards
Castleford Town F.C. players
Bradford City A.F.C. players
English Football League players
Newcastle United F.C. wartime guest players
British Army personnel of World War I
West Yorkshire Regiment soldiers